Sardar Vallabhbhai Patel Police Museum is a museum that traces the history and growth of the police force in India. It is located just opposite the Kollam Junction Railway Station in Kollam, India. The museum is dedicated to barrister and statesman, Vallabhbhai Patel.

Attractions
The museum was opened in 2000. In addition to arms and ammunition of the 18th and 19th centuries, including bullets, guns, machines, and a diversity of other weapons, the museum houses information charts on DNA tests, human bones, fingerprints, snapshots of police dogs and a variety of medals awarded to policemen of different ranks. A concrete statue of Vallabhbhai Patel, weighing 1.1 tons and sculpted by Police Constable Mr. Santosh, was unveiled in January 2005.

Location
 Kollam Junction railway station - 
 Andamukkam City Bus Stand - 
 Kollam KSRTC Bus Stand - 
 Kollam Port - 
 Kollam Beach - 
 Asramam Maidan -

Gallery

References

External links

Law enforcement museums in Asia
State museums in India
Museums in Kollam
Museums established in 2000
2000 establishments in Kerala
Memorials to Vallabhbhai Patel